The following is a list of episodes for the first season of BN Pictures' Aikatsu Friends! television series, which will air on TV Tokyo between April 4, 2018 and March 3, 2019.

Episode list

References

Aikatsu!
Aikatsu! episode lists
2018 Japanese television seasons